Schinas is a surname of Greek origin. Notable people with the surname include:

 Alexandros Schinas ( 1870–1913), Greek assassin who murdered King George I of Greece
 Giorgio Costantino Schinas (1834–1894), Maltese architect and civil engineer
 Margaritis Schinas (born 1962), Greek politician

Greek-language surnames
Surnames